The Netherlands Football League Championship 1925–1926 was contested by 50 teams participating in five divisions. The national champion would be determined by a play-off featuring the winners of the eastern, northern, southern and two western football divisions of the Netherlands. SC Enschede won this year's championship by beating MVV Maastricht, Feijenoord, Stormvogels and Be Quick 1887.

New entrants
Eerste Klasse East:
Promoted from 2nd Division: DOTO Deventer
Eerste Klasse North:
Promoted from 2nd Division: HSC
Eerste Klasse South:
Promoted from 2nd Division: RFC Roermond
Bredania/'t Zesde was the result of a merger between 't Zesde and last seasons competitor Bredania
Eerste Klasse West-I:
Moving in from West-II: DFC, HVV Den Haag, RCH, Stormvogels and VOC
Eerste Klasse West-II:
Moving in from West-I: Ajax Sportsman Combinatie, Feijenoord, HFC Haarlem and ZFC
Promoted from 2nd Division: De Spartaan

Divisions

Eerste Klasse Oost

Eerste Klasse North

Eerste Klasse South

Eerste Klasse West-I

Eerste Klasse West-II

Championship play-off

References

RSSSF Netherlands Football League Championships 1898–1954
RSSSF Eerste Klasse Noord
RSSSF Eerste Klasse Zuid
RSSSF Eerste Klasse West

Netherlands Football League Championship seasons
1925–26 in Dutch football
Netherlands